Angelo Massafra (23 March 1949) is an Italian Catholic archbishop of Arbëreshë ancestry, metropolitan archbishop of the Roman Catholic Archdiocese of Shkodër–Pult since 25 January 2005.

Life 
He was born on 23 March 1949 in San Marzano di San Giuseppe, a historic Arbëreshë community with Albanian ancestry in Apulia.

He was ordained a priest of the Order of Friars Minor on 21 September 1974 by the Archbishop of Lecce Francesco Minerva.

On 7 December 1996, Pope John Paul II nominated him bishop of Rrëshen and consecrated him bishop on 6 January in the St. Peter's Basilica. On 28 March 1998 he was appointed archbishop of Shkodër and on 25 January 2005, following the reorganization of the ecclesiastical circumscriptions of Albania, he became archbishop of the Roman Catholic Archdiocese of Shkodër–Pult, born from the union of the archdiocese of Shkodër and the diocese of Pult.

He made ad limina apostolorum at the Holy See in 2008 and 2017.

See also 

 List of Catholic dioceses in Albania

References

  Wikimedia Commons contiene immagini o altri file su Angelo Massafra

Franciscan bishops
Italian Franciscans
1949 births
Living people
People from the Province of Taranto
Italian people of Arbëreshë descent